On 30 May 2020, Eyad al-Hallaq, (Arabic:  إياد الحلاق ’iiad alhilaq) a 32-year-old autistic Palestinian man, was shot and killed by Israeli Police after not stopping at the Lions' Gate checkpoint in Jerusalem when he was ordered to do so by officers stationed nearby. He fled from the area and police attempted to "neutralize" Halaq during the chase with at least seven shots fired in his direction.

Halaq's relatives stated he was an autistic man who was heading to a school for students with special needs that he attended daily when he was shot by police. Friends and family of Halaq and the Secretary General of the Palestine Liberation Organization, Saab Erekat, have drawn parallels with police brutality in the United States and the murder of George Floyd.

Incident 
Halaq and his teacher were walking on 30 May 2020 to the Elwyn El Quds center which provides services for children and adults with disabilities when they approached the Lions' Gate checkpoint. The checkpoint was part of the daily walk from Halaq's home in East Jerusalem's Wadi al-Joz area to the special-needs center in the Old City, which he had attended since 2014. When he reportedly stepped through the arches of the Gate, officers on duty became suspicious when he placed his hand into his pocket for his cell phone. He had apparently not understood the shouted commands from the officers to halt, but fled on foot and hid in a garbage room. His father told reporters that the teacher attempted to tell police that Halaq was disabled and to check his identity, but officers maintained a distance and opened fire.

In a statement the Israeli police claimed that Halaq was believed to be carrying a weapon after officers spotted an object that looked like a pistol. When he failed to obey their calls to halt, officers gave chase. A local television station reported that he was chased into a dead-end alley, and a senior officer orders a halt in fire after entering the alley. A second officer reportedly ignored orders and fired about six or seven shots from a M-16 rifle which killed Halaq. He was found to not be in possession of a weapon when he was searched after his death.

Investigation 
Following protocol, the officers involved in the shooting were questioned afterwards, and one issued a statement of condolences to Halaq's family through his lawyer in an interview with Israeli Army Radio. Reportedly the officer who continued to fire was a new recruit and his lawyer has argued that he thought he was in real danger.

Relatives of Halaq have demanded any footage of the killing and chase be used in the investigation and for the family to be able to view it, as the Old City is covered extensively by security cameras.

Hallaq's parents have petitioned the High Court of Justice to conclude the investigation of the case and put the two police officers involved on trial. On 21 October 2020 Israeli prosecutors recommended that the police officer who shot and killed al-Hallaq be charged with manslaughter.

The Israel Police Internal Investigations Department opened an investigation into the incident. In October 2020, the Israeli Justice Ministry announced that the shooter would be charged with reckless manslaughter pending a hearing to dispute the charges.

On 17 June 2021, the police officer was charged with "reckless homicide".

Aftermath 

A protest was staged in front of the Church of Nativity in Bethlehem on 2 June, against police brutality, the murder of George Floyd, and the death of Halaq, following similar protests in Jerusalem and Tel Aviv on 30 May. Others used social media to protest with the hashtag #PalestinianLivesMatter while over a thousand mourners attended his funeral.

Reactions 
Halaq's sister Diana told reporters that the police officer who shot her brother should be imprisoned but that she believed the officer would remain unpunished as her family were Palestinian. The leader of the main Arab party in Parliament, Ayman Odeh, echoed concerns about the lack of punishment for the officers, using Twitter to post concerns about an "expected cover-up" and that justice would only be done when the "Palestinian people know freedom and independence".

Benny Gantz, the Alternate Prime Minister of Israel, discussed the issue at a weekly meeting of the Israeli cabinet the next day, stating the government was sorry about the incident and shared in the families grief while calling for a swift investigation. Benjamin Netanyahu was also in attendance and did not comment on the incident. Palestinian President Mahmoud Abbas called the killing a "war crime" and Hamas issued warnings of a new intifada.

The United Nations' Office of the High Commissioner for Human Rights called the killing another case of "the routine use of lethal force by Israeli Security forces against Palestinians in Gaza and in the West Bank, including East Jerusalem". The statement continued by stressing the need for the least force possible to be used in any situation. It has also charged Israel with not being transparent about the rules of engagement, that were against international law regulations.

On 7 June 2020, Prime Minister Benjamin Netanyahu expressed his condolences and said that he "expected a full investigation into the matter." He also said the incident was a "tragedy."

See also 
 Extrajudicial killing
 List of violent incidents in the Israeli–Palestinian conflict, 2020
 Death of Mohammad Habali

Notes

References 

2020 deaths
Police brutality in the 2020s
2020 scandals
2020 in Jerusalem
May 2020 events in Asia
Israeli–Palestinian conflict in Jerusalem
Deaths by firearm in the West Bank
People killed by Israeli security forces
Police brutality in Israel